Excelsior Academy is a mixed all-through school and sixth form. It was opened in September 2008 as a replacement for the Westgate Community College and is situated in the west end of Newcastle upon Tyne, United Kingdom.

The academy was originally for secondary school pupils aged 11 to 18 including a sixth form. It had four sections to the school, which were Jefferson, Milburn, Hadrian and Armstrong.

In mid-2013, Armstrong and Jefferson merged into one large school named Collingwood. In 2012 it was announced that the school would create a primary school called Rainbird, and have an age range of 3 to 19.

The three main secondary schools are based on their own specialist subjects individually:

The school is currently part of the Laidlaw Schools Trust and is sponsored by Lord Laidlaw.

The academy has also been listed in the 200 most improved schools nationally identified by the Department for Education.

Notable people 

 Irvine Laidlaw, Baron Laidlaw – founder and sponsor

Alumni 

 Michael Hoganson - professional footballer for Newcastle United and Derby County.
 Kema Sikazwe - Actor in I, Daniel Blake

References

External links
School website
Laidlaw Schools Trust

Educational institutions established in 2008
Secondary schools in Newcastle upon Tyne
Academies in Newcastle upon Tyne
2008 establishments in England
Primary schools in Newcastle upon Tyne